The Spring WS202 Sprint was a Canadian homebuilt aircraft that was designed and produced by William J. Spring of Burlington, Ontario, introduced in 1996. The aircraft was supplied in the form of plans for amateur construction.

Design and development
The WS202 Sprint featured a cantilever low-wing, a two-seats-in-side-by-side configuration enclosed cockpit under a bubble canopy, fixed tricycle landing gear or conventional landing gear and a single engine in tractor configuration.

The aircraft was made from sheet aluminum.

The aircraft was designed to be constructed from plans and emphasized economy. The designer claimed it could be constructed for US$5000 in 1996, including a second hand Subaru engine. It was designed to be easy to convert between tricycle and conventional landing gear.

The manufacturer estimated the construction time from the supplied plans as 1500 hours.

Operational history
The prototype was displayed at AirVenture in Oshkosh, Wisconsin in 1996.

By 1998 the designer reported that one aircraft had been completed and was flying.

In April 2015 one example had been registered with Transport Canada to the designer, William J. Spring, although its registration was cancelled on 13 February 2013. It is unlikely that the aircraft exists any more.

Specifications (WS202 Sprint)

References

External links
Photo of the WS202 at AirVenture in 1996
 Photo of the WS202

WS202
1990s Canadian sport aircraft
1990s Canadian ultralight aircraft
1990s Canadian civil utility aircraft
Single-engined tractor aircraft
Low-wing aircraft
Homebuilt aircraft
Aircraft first flown in 1996